Sanita Ozoliņa (born 18 October 1975) is a Latvian rower. She competed in the women's double sculls event at the 1996 Summer Olympics.

References

1975 births
Living people
Latvian female rowers
Olympic rowers of Latvia
Rowers at the 1996 Summer Olympics
Sportspeople from Riga